Acacia ligulata is a species of Acacia, a dense shrub widespread in all states of mainland Australia. It is not considered rare or endangered.

Common names include sandhill wattle, umbrella bush, marpoo, dune wattle, small coobah, watarka, and wirra.

The genus Acacia is derived from the Greek akakia, referring to sharp thorns. The shape of the phyllodes named the species ligulata, meaning strap-like or with a small tongue in Latin.

Description

Acacia ligulata grows as an erect or spreading shrub, 2 to 4 meters tall and 3 meters across, sometimes dome-shaped, often branching from the ground. The bark is often grooved at the base, but is otherwise smooth. Its branchlets are angular with yellowish ribs, often with hair.

The phyllodes, appearing like leaves, are light to blue green, usually linear-oblong, slightly curved, 3–10 cm long and 4-10mm wide, thick and hairless, and wrinkled during dry periods. They have a prominent yellowish mid-vein, lateral veins not apparent. The tip of the phyllode is obtuse with a mucro, a small hard point, pointing downward. Two to four glands are found below the center of the phyllode and near the mucro.

Yellow to orange globular flower heads of 5-6mm diameter, singular or 2 to 5 in short axillary racemes, sit on sparsely pubescent peduncles 4-10mm long. Each flower head consists of about 20 minute flowers.

The seed pods, legumes, are light brown and curved, 5–10 cm long and 5-10mm wide, constricted between the seeds and breaking easily into one-seeded segments. The stalk of the seed pod is orange to red. The seeds appear black and oval shaped, up to 3.5x3.5mm in size, situated longitudinal within the seed pod.

Taxonomy

A. ligulata belongs to the A. bivenosa group of 12 species. Previously considered a variety of A. salicina, differing by its rigid branches, undivided crown, and seed pod characteristics. Earlier literature mentions A. williamsonii as a synonym, other literature places the species in the family Mimosaceae.

Distribution and habitat

A. ligulata is one of the most widespread species of Acacia in Australia, common to central and southern Australia, mostly south of the Tropic of Capricorn in arid areas.

Charles Sturt called the habitat ‘stupendous and almost insurmountable sand-ridges of a fiery red’. This area of north-west New South Wales, the Sand Plain Mulga Shrublands, supports an open cover of shrubs and tussock grasses.

A. ligulata is found on sand dunes, on the fringes of salt lakes, on floodplains, in mulga and bluebush communities, in woodlands, in mallee communities.

Ecology

A. ligulata grows in dense shrub communities on sand dunes, otherwise singly scattered. Fast-growing, it stabilises sand dunes and regenerates quickly after disturbance, such as overgrazing. It is known for potential weediness due to rapid regrowth.

It is found in the hottest and driest climates of Australia with rainfall of less than 200mm and survives light frost. It is an indicative species in sand plain mulga shrublands and was used in an emissions bioassay at Olympic Dam.

Its roots are host to witchetty grub and food for the larvae of the butterfly Nacaduba biocellata. The phyllodes are eaten by cattle and often defoliated by rabbits around the lower part of the plant. Kangaroos and livestock use the plants as shelter. Herbivores grazing on the seedlings can severely limit regeneration.

Reproduction and dispersal

A. ligulata flowers during May to November, depending on the region, odd flowers occurring throughout the year. Seeds are produced between November and January. They have diaspores with fleshy appendages indicating dispersal by birds, including the red wattlebird, and ants (myrmecochory). Ants can transport the seeds up to 180m and disperse it within an area of 3000m² around their nest.

Uses

A. ligulata is used as a hedge and windbreak, to stabilise sandy areas, for revegetation and erosion control, also in areas with salinity or alkaline conditions. It can be grown from cuttings and has been used as emergency stock fodder.

Indigenous Australians have used the plant by mixing its ashes with the dried and powdered leaves of Duboisia hopwoodii to prepare a stimulant chewing mixture (pituri) for trading. Gum produced by this species was used for consumption, and the seeds were roasted and ground to make damper. Leaves and bark were used for medicinal purposes, to treat colds, chest infections, and general illnesses.

Gallery

See also
List of Acacia species

References

Fabales of Australia
Flora of New South Wales
Flora of the Northern Territory
Flora of Queensland
Flora of South Australia
Flora of Victoria (Australia)
Acacias of Western Australia
ligulata
Taxa named by Allan Cunningham (botanist)